Michael Jack Schmidt (born September 27, 1949) is an American former professional baseball third baseman who played his entire 18-season career in Major League Baseball (MLB) for the Philadelphia Phillies. Schmidt was a 12-time All-Star and a three-time winner of the National League (NL) Most Valuable Player award (MVP), and he was known for his combination of power hitting and strong defense. As a hitter, he compiled 548 home runs and 1,595 runs batted in (RBIs), and led the NL in home runs eight times and in RBIs four times. As a fielder, Schmidt won the National League Gold Glove Award for third basemen ten times. Schmidt was elected to the Baseball Hall of Fame in 1995 and is widely considered to be the greatest third baseman in baseball history.

Having an unusual batting stance, Schmidt turned his back somewhat toward the pitcher and rocked his rear end back and forth while waiting for a pitch. By standing far back in the batter's box, he made it almost impossible to jam him by pitching inside. Schmidt was one of the best athletes of his era; teammate Pete Rose once said, "To have his body, I'd trade him mine and my wife's, and I'd throw in some cash."

Early life
Schmidt's parents are Joseph Jack Schmidt and Lois Jane Philipps. They managed the Philipps Aquatic Club founded by Lois's great-grandfather Charles A. Philipps. Schmidt was a lifeguard at the club.

Baseball career

Amateur career
Schmidt was drafted by the Phillies in the second round (30th overall) of the 1971 Major League Baseball draft.

Minor Leagues

On June 11, Schmidt was signed by Phillies scout Tony Lucadello, who had followed him since he played Little League Baseball. Six days later, Schmidt made his professional debut in an exhibition game between the Phillies and their Double-A affiliate the Reading Phillies in Reading, Pennsylvania. Schmidt played the whole game at shortstop for the big-league Phillies, hitting a game-winning home run against his future Reading teammates. Schmidt stayed in Reading, spending the rest of the 1971 season at the Double-A level. In 1972, he was promoted to the Triple-A Eugene Emeralds of the Pacific Coast League. Along with shortstop and third base, Schmidt also played second base during his time in the minor leagues.

Major Leagues

1972–1979
Schmidt spent two seasons in the Phillies' farm system, where he batted .263 with 34 home runs and 122 runs batted in. After playing most of the  season for Triple-A Eugene, he was called up to the Phillies in September and made his major league debut against the New York Mets on September 12. Four days later, in Philadelphia on September 16, Schmidt ended Montreal Expos pitcher Balor Moore's streak of 25 scoreless innings pitched with his first career home run.

Following the 1972 season, the Phillies dealt third baseman Don Money to the Milwaukee Brewers to open a spot for Schmidt in their infield.

On June 10, in the Astrodome in Houston, Texas, Schmidt hit a ball off Houston Astros' pitcher Claude Osteen that looked like a sure home run. The ball hit a public address speaker suspended 117 feet above and 329 feet away from home plate, falling into center field. By the ground rules, it remained in play and Schmidt was held to just a single, with the runners on first and second each advancing just one base. It is believed that had the ball not hit the speaker, it would have traveled beyond 500 feet. For the season, Schmidt finished sixth in National League Most Valuable Player balloting as he batted .282 with 116 RBIs and a league-leading 36 home runs to help the Phillies avoid a last-place finish in the National League East for the first time since . His 404 assists in 1974 remains a record for third basemen.

Schmidt's batting average hovered below .200 through May . Solid months of July and August saw his average rise to .249 by the end of the season as he led the league in home runs for the second year in a row, with 38. Schmidt started the  season by hitting 12 home runs in Philadelphia's first 15 games, including four in one game on April 17, becoming the 10th player in major league history to accomplish that feat.

In 1977, Schmidt signed a contract with the Phillies that paid him $561,500 per year, making him the highest-paid player in baseball history to that point and the first to surpass $500,000 annually.

On December 5, 1978, the Phillies signed Pete Rose as a free agent, temporarily making Rose the highest-paid athlete in team sports with a four-year, $3.2-million contract. Instead, the Phillies finished the season at 84–78, and in fourth place in NL East.

1980–1986
On October 3, the Phillies went into Montreal tied with the Expos for first place in the NL East. With a sacrifice fly in the first, and a solo home run in the sixth, Schmidt led the Phillies to a 2–1 victory to capture first place. A day later, Schmidt hit his 48th home run of the season in the 11th inning to give the Phillies the 6–4 extra innings victory over the Expos, and clinch the division. His 48 home runs broke his own team record, and led the National League by a margin of 13 over his nearest competitor. Coupled with a league-leading 121 RBIs, his home runs made Schmidt a unanimous choice for the National League's Most Valuable Player Award.

The Phillies defeated the Houston Astros in the 1980 National League Championship Series to reach the World Series for the third time in franchise history. Though Schmidt had just a career .191 post-season batting average with no home runs and five RBIs, his bat came alive in the 1980 World Series, hitting two homers and driving in seven runs against the Kansas City Royals. The Phillies beat the Royals in six games to win the first World Series in franchise history, and Schmidt won the World Series MVP Award. Following the World Series, Schmidt and four of his Phillies teammates appeared on Family Feud for one week in 1980. He, Larry Bowa, Garry Maddox, Dick Ruthven and Del Unser took on five members of the Kansas City Royals: Dennis Leonard, Dan Quisenberry, Paul Splittorff, John Wathan and Willie Wilson.

Schmidt's best season may have been the strike-shortened  season. His 31 home runs were seven more than anyone else in the league. He also led the NL in runs scored, RBIs, total bases and walks, and set personal highs in batting average, on-base percentage and slugging percentage. He won his second consecutive MVP award, this time with 96% of the vote.

The Phillies led the NL East by 3.5 games when the 1981 Major League Baseball strike hit. As a result, the Phillies were named NL East champions for the first half of the season; however, they lost to the second-half champion Montreal Expos in the 1981 National League Division Series.

In , in celebration of the team's 100th anniversary, Schmidt was voted by fans the greatest player in the history of the franchise. That year, he led the league in home runs for the sixth time in his career to lead the Phillies back to the postseason. Schmidt led his team with a .467 batting average and scored five runs as they defeated the Los Angeles Dodgers in the 1983 National League Championship Series. It was, however, a much different story against the Baltimore Orioles in the 1983 World Series. The Phillies were held to a .195 team batting average; Schmidt went just 1-for-20 with a single.

Following the 1983 season, Schmidt was awarded the Lou Gehrig Memorial Award. That off-season, Pete Rose left the Phillies as a free agent and signed with the Montreal Expos. With a hole at first base, the Phillies played Tim Corcoran and Len Matuszek in a platoon system during the  season. Neither player provided the offensive spark Rose did, and so a change was in order. Early in the  season, Schmidt agreed to move to first base (starting from late May) through the end of the season with Rick Schu assuming third base duties. The Phillies finished with a record below .500 for the first time since 1974.

In , the Phillies moved outfielder Von Hayes to first base and shifted Schmidt back to third base. He responded by winning his third MVP award, a record for third basemen, with a league-leading 37 home runs and 119 RBIs.

1987–1989

Trailing the Pittsburgh Pirates 6–5 in the top of the ninth inning at Three Rivers Stadium on April 18, Schmidt hit his 500th career home run, a three-run shot off of Don Robinson. It put the Phillies in front 8–6, and ended up being the game-winner.

Injuries to Schmidt's rotator cuff caused him to miss the last month and a half of the  season. He returned healthy for the  season. However, after a poor start, Schmidt suddenly chose to announce his retirement in San Diego, on May 29. Although he typically demonstrated little emotion on the field (and was known as "Captain Cool" by many in Philadelphia sports circles), Schmidt surprised many with an emotional, and occasionally tearful, retirement speech. He said in his retirement press conference, ''I left Dayton, Ohio, with two bad knees and a dream of becoming a baseball player; I thank God it came true." His last game was May 28, 1989, against the San Francisco Giants.

Despite his own perceived subpar start and subsequent retirement on May 29, fans once again voted Schmidt to be the starting third baseman for the NL All-Star team. He decided not to play, but he did participate in the game's opening ceremony in uniform.

Career statistics

Over his career, Schmidt set a vast array of hitting and fielding records. In addition to his MVP Awards, Schmidt won ten Gold Gloves, led the league in home runs eight times, in RBIs four times, OPS five times, and walks four times. He was named to 12 All-Star teams. He is the Phillies' all-time leader in games played, at-bats, plate appearances, runs scored, home runs, RBI, walks, strikeouts, total bases, runs created, sacrifice flies, outs, Adj. Batting Runs, Adj. Batting Wins, Extra Base Hits, Times On Base, and Power-Speed number. Schmidt's 548 home runs are the most ever hit by a player who spent his entire career with just one team.

Schmidt is one of only three players (along with Willie Mays and Ken Griffey Jr.) to win 10 Gold Gloves and hit at least 500 home runs, and is the only infielder ever to do so.

Post-playing career and accolades

Schmidt opted, at first, to pursue a more private lifestyle after his career, rather than to become a manager or coach. He has written a number of articles on baseball for CBS and regularly participates in charity golf tournaments.

The Sporting News named Schmidt "The Player of the Decade" of the 1980s in their January 29, 1990, issue.

His uniform number 20 was retired by the Phillies before a game at Veterans Stadium on May 26, 1990. That same season, Mike was inducted as a member of the Philadelphia Baseball Wall of Fame (he had previously been inducted as the third baseman for the Phillies' Centennial Team in 1983).

In 1991, he and Nolan Ryan were inducted into the Peter J. McGovern Little League Museum's Hall of Excellence (established in 1988), thereby becoming only the second and third MLB players inducted into the Hall.

In 1995 (on his first ballot), Schmidt was elected to the National Baseball Hall of Fame with what was at the time the fourth highest voting percentage ever, 96.52%.

In 1997, Schmidt was elected as the starting third-baseman by the Baseball Writers' Association of America to the Major League Baseball All-Time Team. The event was celebrated at the 1997 Major League Baseball All-Star Game in Cleveland, Ohio.

In 1999, he ranked number 28 on The Sporting News'''s list of the 100 Greatest Baseball Players, the highest-ranking third baseman, and the highest-ranking player whose career began after 1967. Later that year, he was elected to the Major League Baseball All-Century Team as the starting third-baseman. The event was celebrated at the 1999 Major League Baseball All-Star Game in Boston, Massachusetts.

Schmidt was honored with a statue outside the third-base gate at Citizens Bank Park in 2004.

On September 27, 2006, Schmidt was announced as the Phillies representative for the DHL Hometown Heroes promotion, beating out Steve Carlton, Richie Ashburn, Robin Roberts and Chuck Klein as most outstanding player in the Phillies history.

Schmidt returned to his alma mater, Ohio University, in October 2014 for the retirement of his number 10 by the Ohio University Baseball Team, which he led to the College World Series in 1970.

On July 14, 2015, Schmidt was named one of the Phillies "Franchise Four" as voted by the fans, along with Steve Carlton, Richie Ashburn and Robin Roberts.

Baseball-Reference.com ranks Schmidt's mustache as the sixth-best in history.

Schmidt has publicly expressed his thoughts on various baseball controversies. He has been a vocal advocate for the reinstatement of Pete Rose to baseball. In July 2005, he appeared on Bob Costas's HBO show Costas Now to discuss steroids, and said, "Let me go out on a limb and say that if I had played during that era I would have taken steroids... We all have these things we deal with in life, and I'm surely not going to sit here and say to you guys, 'I wouldn't have done that.'" In his 2006 book, Clearing the Bases: Juiced Players, Monster Salaries, Sham Records, and a Hall of Famer's Search for the Soul of Baseball, he somewhat recanted that statement, saying that he understood the desire to get a competitive advantage even though he could not condone breaking the rules to do so.

Coaching
Starting in 2002, Schmidt works with the Phillies as a hitting coach during each Spring training. In October 2003, Schmidt was named the manager of the Phillies' Single A Florida State League affiliate, the Clearwater Threshers. He managed them for just the 2004 season, then resigned. In 2009, he served as third-base coach for Team USA in the World Baseball Classic.

Philanthropy
In , Schmidt began sponsoring an annual fishing tournament known as the Mike Schmidt Winner's Circle Invitational at Old Bahama Bay in West End, Grand Bahama Island. The first event raised $27,000, and has since raised over $1.5 million for cystic fibrosis.

In 2008, Schmidt released a wine called Mike Schmidt 548 Zinfandel, a reference to his 548 career home runs, with proceeds also going to the Cystic Fibrosis Foundation.

Broadcasting
NBC used Schmidt as a guest analyst (Marv Albert served as the pregame host) for Game 1 of the 1989 NLCS. Schmidt subsequently, did on-field reporting throughout the series. Schmidt also provided periodic commentary (albeit, taped prior to the playoffs) for ABC during the 1988 NLCS.

Schmidt spent the 1990 season as a color analyst with the Phillies broadcast team on the now-defunct PRISM network, where he was partnered with play-by-play announcer Jim Barniak, and was known to be very candid and honest with his commentary. From 2014 to 2019, he served as a color analyst for the Phillies. Starting in 2014, he provided commentary during Sunday home games on NBC Sports Philadelphia. In 2015, Schmidt also provided commentary during Saturday home games, creating a "Weekends with Schmidt" format. He returned to NBC Sports Philadelphia as a color commentator during Phillies games in 2022.

Illness
On March 16, 2014, Schmidt disclosed that he had battled stage-3 melanoma cancer during the summer of 2013, but that he was now cancer-free.

See also

List of Major League Baseball home run records
List of Major League Baseball career home run leaders
500 home run club
List of Major League Baseball career hits leaders
List of Major League Baseball career doubles leaders
List of Major League Baseball career runs scored leaders
List of Major League Baseball career runs batted in leaders
List of Major League Baseball annual runs batted in leaders
List of Major League Baseball annual home run leaders
List of Major League Baseball annual runs scored leaders
List of Major League Baseball career stolen bases leaders
List of Major League Baseball players who spent their entire career with one franchise
List of Major League Baseball single-game home run leaders
Major League Baseball titles leaders
DHL Hometown Heroes

Further reading

 Kashatus, William C. (2008) Almost A Dynasty: The Rise and Fall of the 1980 Phillies'' Philadelphia: University of Pennsylvania Press.

References

External links

Mike Schmidt  at SABR (Baseball BioProject)
Mike Schmidt at Baseball Almanac
Mike Schmidt at Baseball Biography

Famed call by Harry Kalas of Schmidt's 500th homerun at Three Rivers Stadium, April 18, 1987, MLB

1949 births
Living people
All-American college baseball players
American people of German descent
Baseball coaches from Ohio
Baseball players from Dayton, Ohio
Eugene Emeralds players
Gold Glove Award winners
Major League Baseball players with retired numbers
Major League Baseball third basemen
Minor league baseball managers
National Baseball Hall of Fame inductees
National League All-Stars
National League home run champions
National League Most Valuable Player Award winners
National League RBI champions
Ohio Bobcats baseball players
Philadelphia Phillies announcers
Philadelphia Phillies players
Reading Phillies players
Silver Slugger Award winners
United States national baseball team people
World Series Most Valuable Player Award winners